The 4th Grand National Assembly of Turkey existed from 25 April 1931 to 1 March 1935. 
There were 348 MPs in the parliament all of which were the members of the Republican People's Party (CHP).

Main parliamentary milestones 
Some of the important events in the history of the parliament are the following:
5 May 1931-Mustafa Kemal (Atatürk) was elected as the president of Turkey for the third time
5 May 1931 –İsmet İnönü of CHP formed the 7th government of Turkey
31 May 1933 – Law 2252: Modern university instead of the traditional Darülfünun
3 February 1934 - Law 2381: Parliament approved the Balkan Pact
21 June 1934 – Law 2525: Surname Law
26 November - Law 2590: Ottoman Empire- era titles such as Pasha were banned to be used in public
5 December 1934 – Turkish women gained full suffrage
8 February 1935 –General Elections in which 17 of the MPs were female

References

1931 establishments in Turkey
1935 disestablishments in Turkey
04
4th parliament of Turkey
Republican People's Party (Turkey)
Political history of Turkey